"Never Say Die" is the third solo single by American rock singer Jon Bon Jovi. It was released in 1991 from his debut album Blaze of Glory, the soundtrack album from the film Young Guns II.

Release and Promotion
The single was only ever released in three countries; Poland, Canada and Australia. In Poland it became a Top20 hit peaking at No.17. In Australia it entered the charts on April 7, 1991 and peaked at number 60 during a four-week run.

Charts

References

1991 singles
Jon Bon Jovi songs
Songs written by Jon Bon Jovi
1990 songs
American hard rock songs